Tim Hughes (born 1959) is an American sports announcer and voice actor.

Career
Hughes is a native of Pocatello, Idaho.  He has trademarked the catchphrase he is most associated with, "Can you feel it?", following the pattern of ring announcer Michael Buffer who previously trademarked his own catchphrase, "Let's get ready to rumble!"

Following a layoff from Salt Lake City AM radio station KNRS in 2000, Hughes set up a recording studio in his own home, and created his own company "On the Spot Voiceovers".

Olympic Coverage
Hughes went on to serve as an announcer in several Olympic Games:
 2002 Olympic Winter Games in Salt Lake City, Utah: English Voice for Medals Plaza 
 2004 Olympic Summer Games
 2006 Olympic Winter Games
 2008 Olympic Summer Games

References

External links
 Voice By Hughes
 KSL Radio - On-Air Host
 KSL Greenhouse Show
 KSL Outdoors with Tim Hughes

1959 births
Living people
American sports announcers
American male voice actors